Consort Choe may refer to:

Lady Yeonchang ( 10th century), Seongjong of Goryeo's consort
Queen Wonhwa ( 1010s), consort of Hyeonjong of Goryeo
Queen Jangseon ( 1148), consort of Uijong of Goryeo
Princess Jangsin (died 1184), Yejong of Goryeo's concubine
Choe Yong-deok (died after 1388), concubine of Wang U
Royal Consort Yeong-Bi of the Dongju Choi clan (died after 1389), concubine of Wang U
Royal Consort Gongbin Choe ( 1462), Yejong of Joseon's concubine
Royal Noble Consort Sukbin Choe (1670–1718), Sukjong of Joseon's concubine

See also
Queen Jeongsuk ( 14th century), great-grandmother of Taejo of Joseon
Queen Uihye (died before 1392), mother of Taejo of Joseon